The MV Francop  is a German-owned, Antigua and Barbuda-flagged merchant cargo ship. In November 2009 the Israeli navy boarded the vessel in the Mediterranean Sea, suspecting that it was carrying weapons destined for Hezbollah from the Islamic Republic of Iran in violation of United Nations Security Council Resolution 1701. Hundreds of tons of weapons were found on the ship, which was then directed to berth in Israel.

Background 
Built by Sietas of Neuenfelde and completed in August 2003, the ship was launched as Tavastland. The ship has sailed under the German, British and Antigua and Barbuda flags and is currently under the flag of Russia. It is currently owned by the Russian company Far Eastern Shipping Co., Vladivostok.

Boarding incident 

On 4 November 2009, in an operation named Operation Four Species, Israeli navy commandos of Shayetet 13 boarded the ship in the eastern Mediterranean Sea without resistance, acting on intelligence reports which it had received. A spokesperson for the Israel Defense Forces (IDF) said the ship was carrying "dozens of shipping containers, carrying numerous weapons, disguised as civilian cargo among hundreds of other containers on board". The IDF also claimed that the weapons originated from Iran and were to be directed to Hezbollah. The navy said that the crew was not aware of the purported smuggling and cooperated with Israeli commandos. After the boarding, the Israeli Navy directed the ship to the Israeli port of Ashdod, where a thorough inspection was held.

According to the IDF, the ship picked up the cargo in Damietta, Egypt; the cargo arrived in Egypt on a ship that sailed from Bandar-Abbas, Iran on 25 October. The ship was then set to sail to Limassol, Cyprus and then Latakia, Syria. The IDF suspects that the cargo was intended for Hezbollah, which fought Israel in the 2006 Lebanon War. Following the war, United Nations Security Council Resolution 1701 forbade the shipments of arms to Hezbollah.

An Israeli naval official claimed that the amount of weapons found is ten times more than that found during Operation Noah's Ark. The arms shipment weighed 320 tons and were held in containers marked with Iranian shipping codes. The seized weaponry included 9,000 mortar shells, thousands of 107-mm Katyusha rockets, 600 122-mm rockets, and hundreds of thousands of rounds of ammunition. The arms shipment was the largest ever seized by Israeli authorities.

On 5 November 2009, ambassadors and diplomats from 44 countries and military attaches from 27 armies in the world were invited by the IDF and the Foreign Ministry in order for them to be witnesses of the many weapons and accumulation of ammunition that were found on the Francop ship.

See also 
 2006 Lebanon War
 Operation Noah's Ark
 United Nations Security Council Resolution 1701
 Annie Larsen
 Boka Star
 Chong Chon Gang
 Victoria Affair
List of cargo ships

References 

2003 ships
Merchant ships of Germany
Merchant ships of the United Kingdom
Cargo ships of Antigua and Barbuda
2009 in Israel
Container ships
International maritime incidents
Hezbollah–Israel conflict
Maritime incidents in 2009
Operations involving Israeli special forces